The 1958–59 season was the 67th season in Liverpool F.C.'s existence, and was their fifth consecutive year in the Second Division. The club finished fourth for the second consecutive season, seven points outside the automatic promotion places. 

Liverpool lost their first match in the FA Cup to Worcester City, then in the Southern League, and one league below the Football League at that time. The Third Round match finished 2-1 to Worcester City.

Squad

Goalkeepers
 Doug Rudham
 Tommy Younger

Defenders
 Gerry Byrne
 John Molyneux
 Ronnie Moran
 Geoff Twentyman
 Dick White

Midfielders
 Alan A'Court
 Bobby Campbell
 James Harrower
 Billy Liddell
 Fred Morris
 Johnny Morrissey
 Johnny Wheeler
 Barry Wilkinson

Forwards
 Alan Arnell
 Alan Banks
 Louis Bimpson
 Jimmy Melia
 Bobby Murdoch

Table

Results

Second Division

FA Cup

References
 LFC History.net – 1958-59 season
 Liverweb - 1958-59 Season
 - Liverpool League Results 1958-59 season
 - Liverpool League Results 1958-59 season 
 - Liverpool FA Cup Results 1958-59 season 

Liverpool F.C. seasons
Liverpool